Tawhai is a monotypic genus of Polynesian long-jawed orb-weavers containing the single species, Tawhai arborea. The genus was first described by A. Álvarez-Padilla, R. J. Kallal and Gustavo Hormiga in 2020, and it has only been found in New Zealand. The type species, Tawhai arborea, was originally described under the name "Tetragnatha arborea".

See also
 Tetragnatha
 Orsinome
 List of Tetragnathidae species

References

Monotypic Tetragnathidae genera
Spiders of New Zealand